Crni Vrh (Serbian Cyrillic: Црни врх) is a mountain in central Serbia, near the city of Jagodina. It is a small ski resort, with a mountaineering hut at the top, and two tracks of around 750 meters each.

References

Mountains of Serbia
Rhodope mountain range